Shabnam Nasimi (born 16 February 1991) is an Afghan-born British social activist, commentator, and political figure. She was formerly policy advisor to Minister for Afghan Resettlement Victoria Atkins MP and Minister for Refugees Richard Harrington. A member of the Conservative Party, Nasimi was a candidate in the 2021 local elections.

Early life and education
Nasimi's family came to the UK from Afghanistan, after fleeing the Taliban regime in 1999. Her father Nooralhaq Nasimi gained his PhD in Law in the former Soviet Union and her mother Mahboba completed her Masters in Jurisprudence; they prized education above all else. Her father, Dr. Nooralhaq Nasimi founded and has been running the award-winning charity Afghanistan & Central Asian Association since 2001 to support the integration of refugee and migrant communities in the UK. Her father was appointed Member of the Order of the British Empire (MBE) in the Kings 2022 New Year Honours for services to refugees.

Nasimi went to St Saviour's and St Olave's Church of England School until 18, completing her GCSE and A-levels. She was educated at the Open University where she gained a degree in Law. She then completed an MSc in Global Governance and International Security at Birkbeck University.

Career
Shabnam Nasimi was appointed Policy Advisor to the Minister of Afghan Resettlement (Victoria Atkins MP) in November 2021 and to the Minister for Refugees (Lord Harrington) in February 2022. She worked to support PM Boris Johnsons plans dubbed 'Operation Warm Welcome' including the successful integration of the Afghans who stood side by side with the UK in conflict, their families and those at highest risk who have been evacuated.

In 2019, Nasimi founded Conservative Friends of Afghanistan.

She has advised FCDO, the EU Special Envoy Afghanistan and other private companies, government agencies and NGOs on Afghanistan - and is an ardent campaigner for women's rights, an Ambassador for the 50:50 Parliament campaign.

She has written for The Times, Prospect magazine, the websites Quillette and Free Market Conservatives and the blog ConservativeHome. She has been accused of plagiarizing journalists in her written work. Nasimi has appeared as a political commentator on Newsnight, BBC News, ITV News, Channel 4 and Channel 5 News, as well as other international media to provide commentary and analysis on British Politics, foreign policy, immigration and Social integration, ethnic minority communities in the UK and gender equality.

Honours and awards

In International Women's Day 2022, Shabnam made the Women in Westminster: The 100 - Ones to Watch list.

In 2019, Nasimi was nominated and shortlisted as one of the BBC's 100 Women during 2019.

Political views and activity
At the May 2021 local elections, Nasimi contested the council seat of Cranford ward in Hounslow for the Conservative Party. Nasimi 1,191 votes, finishing in 2nd place out of the 5 candidates that stood.
Nasimi has spoken in favour of the United Kingdom's withdrawal from the European Union and has stated that she voted for Brexit.

Nasimi endorsed Boris Johnson in the 2019 Conservative Party leadership election.

References 

1991 births
Living people
Alumni of the Open University
Alumni of Birkbeck, University of London
BBC 100 Women
British women activists
Afghan women activists
British people of Afghan descent
Conservative Party (UK) people